Jeanne A. Hardy is an American professor of biological and biophysical chemistry at the University of Massachusetts, Amherst. Her group's work is best known for designing allosteric binding sites and control elements into human proteases.

Education 
Hardy received her B.S. and M.S. from Utah State University in 1994, working with Professor Ann Aust on bioinorganic chemistry projects relating to protein binding of iron and asbestos. She received a Ph.D. in 2000 from the University of California, Berkeley, working with Prof. Hillary C.M. Nelson on the structure of Heat Shock Transcription Factor, which plays various roles as a molecular chaperone and an immune stimulant. Her postdoctoral work was undertaken at Sunesis Pharmaceuticals with National Academy of Inventors member and UCSF professor James "Jim" Wells.

Career 
Hardy joined the University of Massachusetts in 2005. She built a research program upon the biophysics of human proteases. Her research focuses especially on caspases, apoptotic proteins involved in the regulation of cell death, and with impacts in conditions such as Alzheimer's and Parkinson's Disease. Hardy's research group has determined allosteric regulation of caspase-6 selectively by zinc, mutation-based regulation of caspase-7, and lead molecules against heat shock and multiple other cysteine proteases. Purportedly for this work, she was awarded tenure in 2012, and promoted to Full Professor in 2018.

Awards 

 2018 - Inaugural Mahoney Prize in the Life Sciences
 2014 - Fulbright Scholar, Paris, France
 2009 - Lilly Teaching Fellowship
 2008 - Cottrell Scholar Award
 2003 - NIH Postdoctoral Fellow
 2000 - JSPS Postdoctoral Fellow

References 

American biophysicists
American women biologists
Utah State University alumni
Women biophysicists
University of Massachusetts Amherst faculty
Living people
Year of birth missing (living people)
American women academics
21st-century American women
Fulbright alumni